He's a Cockeyed Wonder is a 1950 American comedy film directed by Peter Godfrey and written by Jack Henley. The film stars Mickey Rooney, Terry Moore, William Demarest, Charles Arnt, Ross Ford and Ned Glass. The film was released on December 2, 1950, by Columbia Pictures.

Plot

Cast  
Mickey Rooney as Freddie Frisby
Terry Moore as Judy Sears
William Demarest as Bob Sears
Charles Arnt as J.B. Caldwell
Ross Ford as Ralph Caldwell
Ned Glass as Sam Phillips
Mike Mazurki as 'Lunk' Boxwell
Douglas Fowley as 'Crabs' Freeley
William 'Bill' Phillips as 'Pick' Reedley

Reception
Bosley Crowther of The New York Times reviewed the film negatively, criticizing Rooney's lead performance.

References

External links 
 

1950 films
Columbia Pictures films
American comedy films
1950 comedy films
Films directed by Peter Godfrey
American black-and-white films
1950s English-language films
1950s American films